The Nairobi–Nakuru–Mau Summit Highway is a road in Kenya, connecting the capital city of Nairobi, in Nairobi County, with the towns of Naivasha, Nakuru and Mau Summit, in Nakuru County.

Location

The project also involves the resurfacing of the Rironi–Mai Mahiu–Naivasha Road, also referred to as the Escarpment Road.

Overview
This road is part of the Northern Corridor, that is used in the transportation of goods and passengers from the port city of Mombasa and the capital city of Nairobi, to Kenya's western counties and the land-locked countries of Uganda, South Sudan, Rwanda, Burundi and the eastern parts of the Democratic Republic of the Congo.

The Nairobi–Nakuru–Mau Summit Highway, has also been identified by the National Transportation and Safety Authority of Kenya (NTSA), to contain the two most accident-prone stretches of road in Kenya. These are (a) the highway between Nairobi and Nakuru and (b) the section of road Sobea–Salgaa–Mau Summit, on the road between Nakuru and Eldoret, known as the Salgaa stretch.

Upgrading to dual carriageway
In order to alleviate the perpetual traffic jams and the slow travel times along this stretch of highway, the government of Kenya, through the Kenya National Highway Authority (KeNHA), decided in 2017 to expand the highway from two lanes to four lanes, with toll stations, under a public-private-partnership arrangement.

Of the ten firms that expressed initial interest, only two consortia submitted written bids. The two are (a) The consortium comprising Aiim, Egis, Mota-Engil and Orascom and (b) The Rift Valley Connect Consortium comprising Vinci Highways SAS, Meridian Infrastructure Africa Fund, and Vinci Concessions SAS.

One of these consortia was awarded the contract to design, finance, build, operate, maintain the four-lane toll-highway for 30 years after commissioning, and then transfer it to the government of Kenya. The budgeted construction cost was KSh180 billion (US$1.8 billion).

In October 2020, the government of Kenya, represented by Kenya's Ministry of Transport, Infrastructure, Housing, Urban Development & Public Works, through KeNHA, and The Rift Valley Connect Consortium comprising Vinci Highways SAS, Meridian Infrastructure Africa Fund, and Vinci Concessions SAS, signed a €1.3 billion (KES:163.8 million) contract to (a) upgrade the existing Nairobi–Mau Summit Road to a dual four-lane highway (b) upgrade and widen the Rironi–Mai Mahiu–Naivasha Road to become a seven-metre carriageway with  shoulders on both sides (c) construction of a  elevated highway through Nakuru town and (d) construct and improve the interchanges along this highway. The consortium will own, design, fund, construct, operate and maintain the toll-highway for 30 years after commercial commissioning, after which ownership will revert to the Kenyan government. Construction is expected to begin in the second half of 2021 and last at least 42 months.

See also
 East African Community
 List of roads in Kenya

References

External links
 Why you will soon be paying on the spot to use major roads As of 16 June 2018.

Roads in Kenya
Nairobi
Kiambu County
Nyandarua County
Nakuru County